Yorick Le Saux (born 10 August 1968) is a French cinematographer. He was born in Neuilly-sur-Seine. He graduated from La Fémis in 1994. His past credits include Swimming Pool, When I Was a Singer, Julia, I Am Love, and Carlos. In 2011, Variety listed him as one of the "10 Cinematographers to Watch".

Filmography
Feature films

 Sitcom (1998)
 Café de la plage (2001)
 Swimming Pool (2003)
 5x2 (2004)
 When I Was a Singer (2006)
 Boarding Gate (2007)
 Julia (2008)
 I Am Love (2009)
 Potiche (2010)
 Carlos (2010)
 Arbitrage (2012)
 Only Lovers Left Alive (2013)
 Clouds of Sils Maria (2014)
 A Bigger Splash (2015)
 Personal Shopper (2016)
 High Life (2018)
 Non-Fiction (2018)
 Little Women (2019)
 Deception (2021)

Short films
 A Summer Dress (1996)
 See the Sea (1997)

Television
 We Are Who We Are (2020) (3 episodes)
 Irma Vep (2022)

Awards
 2011 - 8th International Cinephile Society Awards - Cinematography (I Am Love)

References

External links
 
 

French cinematographers
People from Neuilly-sur-Seine
1968 births
Living people